Kal Dasht or Gol Dasht may refer to:

Kal Dasht-e Bala
Kal Dasht-e Pain